Best Wishes for Tomorrow is a Japanese film by director Takashi Koizumi and based on the novel Nagai Tabi ("A long journey") by Shōhei Ōoka. It stars Makoto Fujita as Lieutenant General Tasuku Okada during the Yokohama War Crimes Trials.

Plot summary
The film depicts the war crimes trial of Lieutenant General Tasuku Okada, who ordered the execution of 38 captured US prisoners of war, after he considered them to be war criminals for the war time fire bombing of Nagoya. The movie seeks to call attention to supposed American war crime culpability in the fire and atomic bombings of Japan.

References

External links

Official Site

2007 films
Films based on works by Shōhei Ōoka
2000s Japanese-language films
2000s Japanese films